American rapper A Boogie wit da Hoodie has released four studio albums, two mixtapes, 33 music videos, four extended plays (EPs) and 49 singles (including twenty-three as a featured artist).

Albums

Studio albums

Mixtapes

EPs

Singles

As lead artist

As featured artist

Other charted songs

Music videos

Guest appearances

Notes

References

External links
 
 
 

Discographies of American artists
Hip hop discographies